The 1955 Colombo Cup was the last edition of the Colombo Cup to take place. It was held in Dacca, East Pakistan and won by India for a record 4th time.

Points Table
(C) refers to champions

Matches
All the results are based on data from

Reference

Colombo Cup
1955 in Ceylon